Scantius is a genus of red bugs in the family Pyrrhocoridae. There are at least two described species in Scantius.

Species
These two species belong to the genus Scantius:
 Scantius aegyptius (Linnaeus, 1758) g b (Mediterranean red bug)
 Scantius forsteri (Fabricius, 1781) g
Data sources: i = ITIS, c = Catalogue of Life, g = GBIF, b = Bugguide.net

References

Further reading

External links

 

Pyrrhocoridae